The ninth and final season of the television comedy series The Middle began on October 3, 2017, on ABC in the United States. It was produced by Blackie and Blondie Productions and Warner Bros. Television with series creators DeAnn Heline and Eileen Heisler as executive producers. On August 2, 2017, it was announced that the ninth season would be the series' last, at the request of the series' creators. The season was dubbed as "The Farewell Season" and ran for 24 episodes.

The show is about a working-class family led by Frances "Frankie" Heck (Patricia Heaton), a middle-aged Midwestern woman married to Michael "Mike" Heck (Neil Flynn), who resides in the small fictional town of Orson, Indiana. The town of Orson is based in Jasper, Indiana.  Frankie and Mike are the parents of three children, Axl (Charlie McDermott), Sue (Eden Sher), and Brick (Atticus Shaffer). The series ended with a one-hour series finale on May 22, 2018. A spin-off was in the works, but was abandoned by ABC in November 2018.

Cast

Main
 Patricia Heaton as Frankie Heck
 Neil Flynn as Mike Heck
 Charlie McDermott as Axl Heck
 Eden Sher as Sue Heck
 Atticus Shaffer as Brick Heck

Recurring
 Brock Ciarlelli as Brad Bottig
 Daniela Bobadilla as Lexie Brooks
 Beau Wirick as Sean Donahue
 Pat Finn as Bill Norwood
 Casey Burke as Cindy Hornberger
 Jen Ray as Nancy Donahue
 Alphonso McAuley as Charles "Hutch" Hutchinson
 Sean O'Bryan as Ron Donahue

Guest
 Jackson White as Aidan, Sue's unintended romantic interest
 Jonathan Goldstein as Mark Beckett, Sue's statistics professor
 Paul Hipp as Reverend Tim-Tom, the youth pastor at the Hecks' church
 Lisa Rinna as Tammy Brooks, Lexie's mother
 Gregory Harrison as Bennett Brooks, Lexie's father
 French Stewart as Principal Cameron
 Maree Cheatham as Sylvia Hammond-Tucker, the main suspect in the death of her sister, a woman whom Frankie and Brick believed was murdered
 Marsha Mason as Pat Spence, Frankie's mother
 Jimmy Bellinger as Edwin, the manager at Spudsy's, where Sue (currently) and Axl and Brick (formerly) have all worked
 Brenna D'Amico as Lilah, Brick's new crush at school
 Brian Doyle-Murray as Don Ehlert, the owner of the car dealership where Frankie used to work
 Brittany Ross and Natalie Lander as Courtney and Debbie, airheaded cheerleaders who dated Axl as one in high school
 John Cullum as Michael "Big Mike" Heck Sr., Mike's father
 Blaine Saunders as Carly, Sue's best friend since middle school
 Corbin Bleu as Luke, Aidan's friend and bandmate
 Norm Macdonald as Rusty Heck, Mike's brother
 Tommy Bechtold as Kenny, Axl's former college roommate and friend
 Rose Abdoo as Jodie "Mrs. K" Kozicki, Brick's health teacher
 Malcolm Foster Smith as Dave, a worker at Mike's quarry
 Troy Metcalf as Jim, a worker at Mike's quarry
 Greg Cipes as Chuck, a worker at Mike's quarry
 Brooke Shields as Rita Glossner, mother of the reckless Glossner boys who terrorize the Hecks' neighborhood
 Wade Chandler as Derrick Glossner
 Gibson Bobby Sjobeck as Diaper Glossner
 Dave Foley as Dr. Fulton, Brick's therapist and counselor at school
 Jack McBrayer as Dr. Ted Goodwin, a dentist and Frankie's current employer
 Peter Breitmayer as Pete Miller, Frankie's former workmate who is the top salesman at Ehlert Motors
 Nick Shafer as Arlo, Brick's old friend from the socially-challenged group who has now outgrown his quirks
 Andrew J. Fishman as Zack, Brick's old friend from the socially-challenged group who has now outgrown his quirks
 Katlin Mastandrea as "Weird" Ashley Wyman, Axl's accidental prom date in high school who has stalked him since then

Episodes

Ratings

References

The Middle (TV series)
2017 American television seasons
2018 American television seasons